Muhammad Khan Toor Utmankhel is a Pakistani politician who is member-elect of the Provincial Assembly of the Balochistan and he is Commerce and Trade Minister of Balochistan. He belong to Utmankhel tribe/community in Balochistan.

On 8 October 2018, he was inducted into the provincial Balochistan cabinet of Chief Minister Jam Kamal Khan.

References

Living people
Balochistan Awami Party MPAs (Balochistan)
Year of birth missing (living people)